Homeplus is a Korean discount store retail chain running about 140 branches with 25,000 employees throughout South Korea. Homeplus is the second largest retailer in South Korea, behind Shinsegae Group's e-mart chain.

Homeplus operates  its hypermarkets, super market chain 'Homeplus Express', convenience store '365 Plus' and online shopping service. Homeplus stores offer everything from groceries to clothes and appliances.

Starting in 1997 with distribution business department of Samsung C&T Corporation, Homeplus opened its first hypermarket in Daegu and its second branch in West Busan. In 1999, a joint venture between Samsung C&T and worldwide British retail chain Tesco, ‘SamsungTesco’ was launched, and it has grown into the second largest retailer in Korea by taking over 33 Homever (ex-Carrefour) stores since 2008. On March 1, 2011, due to the expiration of the mutual use contract with the Samsung Group, the corporate name was changed from Samsung Tesco Co., Ltd. to Homeplus Co., Ltd. And on November 22, 2011, the first store of Homeplus 365, a convenience store brand, was opened. In September 2015 the company was sold to MBK Partners, a South Korean buyout firm, which partnered with the Canada Pension Plan Investment Board and Singapore's Temasek Holdings in a transaction worth £4.2 billion. It is headquartered in Gangnam-gu, Seoul, Korea in 2015, and operates a total of 107 hypermarkets and 828 expresses nationwide.

Homever
Homever (홈에버) was a brand name of a hypermarket of E.Land Retail Limited, which is part of the E.Land Group. E.Land Group, the largest operators specializing in fashion and retail business, production and retail corporations in Korea acquired Korean operations of Carrefour in September 2006 to expand the Group's retail presence in Korea.  After the acquisition, Carrefour Korea was renamed to Homever. Homever operated 36 hypermarkets with a combined sales area of approximately 112,366 pyung which translates to 371,458 sqm.

Homever was acquired by Tesco in 2008 and all Homever hypermarkets were re-branded as Homeplus.

See also
E-mart
Lotte Mart
Shinsegae

References

External links

Official website (in Korean)
 E-commerce website (Korean)

Tesco
Former Samsung subsidiaries
Hypermarkets
Discount stores
Retail companies of South Korea
Retail companies established in 1997
Companies based in Seoul
Temasek Holdings
CPP Investment Board companies
South Korean companies established in 1997
2015 mergers and acquisitions